Lovelorn Dolls is a Belgian female-fronted gothic rock/metal band founded by guitarist Bernard Daubresse and singer Kristell Lowagie. Their sound is made of heavy guitar riffs, loud catchy melodies, up-paced synth sequences and Kristell’s characteristic chameleon female vocals.

History 
 
Lovelorn Dolls consists of the duo Ladyhell (Kristell Lowagie) (vocals, arrangements, words) and Corpus Christi (Bernard Daubresse) (music, programming, guitars, production).

They mix alternative, electro and rock and are inspired by the visual styles of Tim Burton and Marilyn Manson and musically by Lacuna Coil, Evanescence, The Birthday Massacre and Garbage.

The EP An Intense Feeling of Affection (2011) was the first result of the duo released only six months after their formation.

The first compositions are accompanied by drum machines and fronted by Ladyhell's voice, close to Björk, Liv Kristine and Anneke van Giersbergen. The cover art of the album is by Gogo Melone.
 
In early 2012, they recorded their first album The House of Wonders and met the producer Victor Love (Omega Lithium, Dope Stars Inc.). Victor fit the atmosphere of Lovelorn and gave them the sound that the band needed to go further. This album was released in 2013 under Alfa Matrix label.
 
In October 2014, the second album Japanese Robot Invasion was released. With less metal and more synthesizers, the combo experimented with new musical territories while keeping their own sound. The cover art of the album is designed by Natalie Shau, famous for her artworks for Cradle of Filth.

The band toured Europe, and was invited to perform at EUROROCK and FemME Festival.

2016 saw a break in the band's career. Kristell used this break to release her solo album under the name SIN.SIN.

They came back in 2017 with a new EP Lament and their third album, Darker Ages, was released in Feb 9, 2018, still on Alfa Matrix.

Style 
Lovelorn Dolls can be described as a mixture of gothic rock, synthpop, metal and electronic touches.

Line Up 

Present members:
Kristell Lowagie (as Ladyhell) - vocals/composer/writer/visuals
Bernard Daubresse (as Corpus Christi) - guitars/keyboards/composer/writer

Discography 
EP's

 2011 – An Intense Feeling of Affection (Demo)
 2013 - After Dark (Alfa Matrix)
 2014 – The Thrill (Alfa Matrix)
 2015 - Happy Valentine (Alfa Matrix)
 2016 - An Intense Feeling of Affection, re-issue (Alfa Matrix)
 2017 – Lament (Alfa Matrix)

Albums

 2013 - The House of Wonders (Alfa Matrix)
 2014 - Japanese Robot Invasion (Alfa Matrix)
 2018 - Darker Ages (Alfa Matrix)

Compilations

 Sounds From the Matrix 13 & 14 (Alfa Matrix)
 Gothic Spirits Pres. Dark Ladies 3 & 4 (ZYX Music Group)
 Absolute Grrrls Manifesto (Chapter 1) (Alfa Matrix)
 Gothic Spirits 16 & 17 (ZYX Music Group)
 Gothic Compilation 64
 Gothic Spirits 19 (ZYX Music Group)
 4.4 U (Alfa Matrix)
 Matrix Downloaded 002 (Alfa Matrix)
 Matrix Downloaded 003 (Alfa Matrix)
 A Strange Play - tribute to The Cure (Alfa Matrix)

References

External links 
 Official Lovelorn Dolls website

Belgian rock music groups